In archaeology, a pottery gauge is a profile gauge used for pots.

A pottery gauge is one of various tools used in pottery to ensure that pots thrown on a potter's wheel are uniform in size or shape.  Some pottery gauges simply ensure that the height and diameter are consistent, others are templates or shapers.

Notes

Pottery
Tools